Dan Brady (born July 4, 1961) is a Republican member of the Illinois House of Representatives. The 105th district, located in McLean County, includes portions of Bloomington and Normal, and all of Chenoa, Colfax, Cooksville, Downs, Fairbury, Forrest, Hudson, Lexington, and Towanda.

Early career 
Brady was born in Bloomington on July 4, 1961. He attended Southern Illinois University Carbondale for his Associates Degree and St. Ambrose University for his Bachelors. He is a funeral home operator by profession. In 1992, Brady was elected McLean County Coroner, a position he was later elected to again in 1996.

Illinois House of Representatives 
In 2000, Bill Brady vacated his State House seat to run for Congress in Illinois's 15th congressional district. Dan Brady defeated Bill Brady's brother Ed Brady in the Republican primary for the 88th district. Brady defeated Democratic candidate John Owen in the general election.

As part of the 2011 decennial reapportionment process, Brady was drawn into the 105th district which he has represented since 2013.

Brady currently serves as Deputy Minority Leader, a position he has held since 2017. While in the House, Brady has cosponsored several pieces of legislation such as IL HB0642, which establishes term limits for all leadership positions in the general assembly.

As of July 3, 2022, Representative Brady is a member of the following Illinois House committees:

 Appropriations - Higher Education Committee (HAPI)
 Executive Committee (HEXC)
 Higher Education Committee (HHED)
 Insurance Committee (HINS)
 Insurance Review Subcommittee (HINS-INSU)
 Rules Committee (HRUL)
 Special Issues (INS) Subcommittee (HINS-SPIS)

Secretary of State 
Brady announced his candidacy to succeed retiring incumbent Jesse White for Secretary of State in the 2022 Illinois Secretary of State election. He became the first Republican candidate to have announced his run. His campaign platform focused on decreasing wait times at motor facilities as well as increasing organ donation registration.

Personal life 
Brady lives in Bloomington, Illinois with his wife, Teri Brady and their two children. Brady is a Catholic.

Electoral history

2000

2002

2004

2006

2008

2010

2012

2014

2016

2018

2022

References

External links
Representative Dan Brady (R) 105th District at the Illinois General Assembly
By session: 98th, 97th, 96th, 95th, 94th, 93rd
Dan Brady for State Representative 
 
Profile at Ballotpedia
Dan Brady at Illinois House Republican Caucus
https://votedanbrady.com

1961 births
21st-century American politicians
Living people
Republican Party members of the Illinois House of Representatives
Politicians from Bloomington, Illinois